Monterinaldi is a village in Tuscany, central Italy, administratively a frazione of the comune of Radda in Chianti, province of Siena.

Monterinaldi is about 40 km from Siena and 5 km from Radda in Chianti.

Bibliography 
 

Frazioni of Radda in Chianti